Pletcher is a surname.  Notable people with the surname include:

 David M. Pletcher (1920–2004), American historian
 John Pletcher, American major general
 Todd Pletcher (born 1967), American thoroughbred trainer

See also
 Fletcher (surname)
 Pletcher, Alabama, an unincorporated community